Dghe is a town in Eritrea. It is located in the Gash-Barka region and is the capital of Dghe District.

References
Statoids.com, retrieved December 8, 2010

Populated places in Eritrea
Gash-Barka Region